Cerise is a fictional superhero appearing in American comic books published by Marvel Comics, in particular those featuring Excalibur and other books of the X-Men franchise. Created by Alan Davis, the character first appeared in Excalibur #47 (March 1992).

Publication history 
Cerise first appeared in Excalibur #47 (March 1992), created by Alan Davis.

Fictional character biography
Cerise is an extraterrestrial from the planet Shaskofrugnon in the Shi'ar Empire.  As she has revealed in her first appearance, she is the gene stock of Subruki, Zarstock, and Kuli Ka. She was accidentally transported to Earth after deserting the empire's brutal army, the Ghrand Jhar, refusing to fire upon innocents and as a result causing the death of her crew. She became a member of Excalibur upon encountering them,  and later became romantically involved with Nightcrawler.

Alongside Excalibur, she battled the Anti-Phoenix's rock creatures. She also fought Necrom alongside Excalibur. She later encountered the Crazy Gang. Alongside Excalibur, she was attacked by Jamie Braddock and Sat-Yr-9, but the team managed to overpower their attackers. She next aided Excalibur and the X-Men against Troll Associates. Cerise and Nightcrawler then encountered the Knight Errant. She was then attacked by the Sentinels and captured by Nigel Orpington-Smythe. She then met Khaos, and alongside Khaos and Excalibur she battled his foe Ghath on their planet Irth, and invited Khaos to join Excalibur.

During the "Warpies Saga", wherein superhuman children were being manipulated, Cerise was baffled with the concept of "children". Shadowcat tried to explain to her how infants are born and grow up to become adults. Cerise reveals that she "emerged from the source" as she is.

Eventually, Cerise was taken into custody by the Starjammers for her crimes against the Shi'ar Empire.  She was sent to the pan-dimensional prison Krag, where she was revealed to have destroyed the Shi'ar recruitment vehicle (Ghrand Jhar) to prevent it from carrying out further acts of genocide. She was forced to kill the second Fang in personal combat. The Shi'ar empress Lilandra pardoned Cerise for her crimes, given their circumstances, and allowed her to serve out her prison sentence as a personal aide. Cerise's role in the Shi'ar Empire is to investigate reports of brutality and violence among Shi'ar officials.

During 2000's "Maximum Security" crossover, Nightcrawler professed at one point that he still loves her, but at the time he was planning to become a Catholic priest, and thus could not rekindle their relationship.

Cerise appeared in the 2006 storyline "Annihilation" as a member of the Graces, a group of female warriors, led by Gamora.

Powers and abilities
Cerise is a member of the alien Shi'ar race, making her physical abilities somewhat more powerful than an Earth human.

She also has the ability to generate and psionically manipulate energy fields of coherent red spectrum light force. She can project the light as simple brightness, or as concussive blasts, or use it to form "solid" objects such as swords, force fields, shields, funnels, and more. She was even able to make a light armor covering Nightcrawler as he trained with Captain Britain.  Cerise can create a bubble of coherent light around herself which she can levitate through the air. She once even used this energy to fly a whole broken Sentinel holding her friends within, across the Atlantic Ocean as a means of disguise. She can also fly naturally (without use of her energy fields), and hold her breath for six or seven minutes.

Cerise wears gloves that contain broad-band sensor arrays which allow her to search for specific life-forms, energy, and temporal/dimensional abnormalities in a surrounding area. She also wore a "transit suit" permitting travel through hyperspace. Her equipment was designed by Shi'ar scientists and craftsmen.

Cerise is a superb warrior, having received intensive combat training in the Shi'ar military, and is a trained starship navigator.

Reception

Accolades 

 In 2019, CBR.com ranked Cerise 7th in their "10 Most Powerful Members Of Excalibur" list.
 In 2020, Scary Mommy included Cerise in their "Looking For A Role Model? These 195+ Marvel Female Characters Are Truly Heroic" list.

Other versions

X-Men: The End 
In the future timeline seen in X-Men: The End, Cerise an elite member of the Imperial Guard is sent by her Empress Lilandra undercover as a blue slaver to rescue Jean Grey. While she completes her mission in rescuing Jean, her cover was blown by Mr. Sinister and she is killed by his agent, Shaitan. In the years following her sacrifice would be remembered by former lover and Excalibur teammate Nightcrawler who would honor her death by naming his own daughter, Cerise Wagner, after her.

References

External links
UncannyXmen.net Character Profile on Cerise

Characters created by Alan Davis
Comics characters introduced in 1992
Excalibur (comics)
Fictional aviators
Fictional characters who can manipulate light
Fictional characters with energy-manipulation abilities
Marvel Comics aliens
Marvel Comics extraterrestrial superheroes
Marvel Comics female superheroes
Shi'ar